The Boeing 367-80, known simply as the Dash 80, is an American quadjet prototype aircraft built by Boeing to demonstrate the advantages of jet propulsion for commercial aviation. It served as basis for the design of the KC-135 tanker and the 707 airliner.

The Dash 80 first flew in 1954, less than two years from project launch. Its US$16 million cost (equivalent to $ million today) was an enormous risk for Boeing, which at the time had no committed customers. Only one example was built, which has been preserved and is currently on public display at the Smithsonian's National Air and Space Museum's Udvar-Hazy Center in Virginia.

Design and development
By the late 1940s two developments encouraged Boeing to begin considering building a passenger jet. The first  was the maiden flight in 1947 of the B-47 Stratojet. The second was the maiden flight in 1949 of the world's first jet airliner, the de Havilland Comet. Boeing President Bill Allen led a company delegation to the UK in summer 1950, where they saw the Comet fly at the Farnborough Airshow, and also visited the de Havilland factory at Hatfield, Hertfordshire where the Comets were being built. Boeing felt it had mastered the swept wing and podded engines which it saw as key technologies that would enable it to improve on the Comet.

In 1950, Boeing tentatively produced a specification for a jet airliner dubbed the Model 473-60C. The airlines were unconvinced because they had no experience with jet transports and were enjoying success with piston engined aircraft such as the Douglas DC-4, DC-6, Boeing Stratocruiser and Lockheed Constellation.

Boeing was experienced at selling to the military but had not enjoyed the same success with civil airliners. This market was dominated by Douglas which was adept at meeting the needs of airlines by refining and developing its range of propeller-driven aircraft, and in 1950 was marketing the forthcoming DC-7. Boeing decided the only way to overcome the airlines' suspicion of the jet – and of itself – was to show them a completed aircraft.

As the first of a new generation of passenger jets, Boeing wanted the aircraft's model number to emphasize the difference from its previous propeller-driven aircraft which bore 300-series numbers. The 400-, 500- and 600-series were already used by missiles and other products, so Boeing decided that the jets would bear 700-series numbers, and the first would be the 707.  The marketing department at Boeing chose 707 because they thought it was more appealing than 700.  

Although the design was announced publicly as the Model 707, the prototype was referred to within Boeing simply as the Dash 80 or "-80".

By the time the Boeing company committed to production, the decision had been made to design the production model 707 as a six-abreast design, with a larger  fuselage, after C. R. Smith, CEO of American Airlines, told Boeing he wouldn't buy the 707 unless it was an inch wider than the then-proposed Douglas DC-8 passenger jet. This decision did not unduly delay the introduction of the production model since the -80 had been largely hand-built, using little production tooling.

Tex Johnston noted, "Months before the Comet's tragic vulnerability became known, Boeing engineers specified aluminum skin of a significantly thicker gauge. In addition, they welded titanium 'tear stoppers' at frequent intervals inside the skin, including plug-type doors that sealed tighter as the cabin pressure differential increased at higher altitudes, switched to triple-strength round-corner windows, and used spot welds (instead of rivets) and a twenty-inch circumferential rib spacing. Boeing subjected a Dash 80 (707) fuselage of that design to thousands of pressurization cycles, proving the validity of the structure."

Operational history
By early 1952 the designs were complete and in April the Boeing board approved the program. Construction of the Dash 80 started in November in a walled-off section of Boeing's Renton plant. As a proof of concept prototype there was no certification and no production line and most of the parts were custom built. The aircraft was not fitted with an airline cabin; a plywood lining housed the instrumentation for the flight test program.

The Dash 80 rolled out of the factory on May 15, 1954, two years after the project was approved and 18 months after construction had started. During a series of taxi trials the port landing gear collapsed on May 22; the damage was quickly repaired and the first flight was on July 15, 1954.

Following flights revealed a propensity to "Dutch roll" - an alternating yawing and rolling motion. Boeing already had experience with this on the B-47 Stratojet and B-52 Stratofortress and had developed a yaw damper system on the B-47 that could be adapted to the Dash 80. Other problems were found with the engines and brakes, the latter once failing completely on landing causing the aircraft to overshoot the runway.

Boeing used the Dash 80 on demonstration flights for airline executives and other industry figures. These focused attention on the question of what the cabin of a passenger jet should look like. In a departure from its usual practice Boeing hired industrial design firm Walter Dorwin Teague to create a cabin.

Prior to demonstration for passenger airlines, the Dash 80 was fitted with Boeing's Flying Boom for aerial refueling which served as a prototype for the KC-135 Stratotanker and its later derivatives.

The barrel roll
As part of the Dash 80's demonstration program, Bill Allen invited representatives of the Aircraft Industries Association (AIA) and International Air Transport Association (IATA) to the Seattle's 1955 Seafair and Gold Cup Hydroplane Races held on Lake Washington on August 6, 1955. The Dash 80 was scheduled to perform a simple flyover, but Boeing test pilot Alvin "Tex" Johnston instead performed two barrel rolls to show off the jet airliner.

The next day, Allen summoned Johnston to his office and told him not to perform such a maneuver again, to which Johnston replied that he was simply "selling airplanes" and asserted that doing so was completely safe.

Boeing Chief Test Pilot John Cashman stated that just before he piloted the maiden flight of the Boeing 777 on June 12, 1994, his last instructions from then-Boeing President Phil Condit were "No rolls."

Use as an experimental aircraft
After the arrival of the first production 707 in 1957 the Dash 80 was adapted into a general experimental aircraft and used by Boeing to test a variety of new technologies and systems. One of its most important tasks during the late 1950s was to test systems for the new Boeing 727, including the fitting of a fifth engine in the rear fuselage. Other tests included experiments with different airfoil shapes and a number of high lift devices such as blown flaps, in which compressed air bled from the engines is directed over the flaps to increase lift during takeoff and landing.

Final flight

After 2,350 hours and 1,691 flights the aircraft was withdrawn from use in 1969 and placed in storage. For the next 18 years the aircraft was stored at a "desert boneyard" now called the 309th Aerospace Maintenance and Regeneration Group (AMARG) at Davis-Monthan Air Force Base near Tucson, Arizona before being retrieved by Boeing in 1990 for restoration. The Dash 80's final flight was to Dulles International Airport near Washington, D.C. on August 27, 2003. Repainted to its original yellow and brown Boeing livery, it was put on display at the Steven F. Udvar-Hazy Center, an annex of the Smithsonian Institution's National Air and Space Museum, located adjacent to Dulles Airport in Chantilly, Virginia.

Specifications (Boeing 367-80)

See also

References
Notes

Citations

Bibliography

 Bowers, Peter M. Boeing aircraft since 1916. London: Putnam Aeronautical Books, 1989. .
 Irving, Clive. Wide Body: The Making of the Boeing 747. Philadelphia: Coronet, 1994. .
 Tony Pither. The Boeing 707 720 and C-135. Tonbridge, Kent, UK: Air-Britain (Historians) Ltd, 1998. 
 Wilson, Stewart. Airliners of the World. Fyshwick, Australia: Aerospace Publications Pty Ltd., 1999. .

External links

 Boeing 367-80 history on Boeing.com
 Boeing 707 family history (including 367-80) on Boeing.com
  LIFE photo essay 'Boeing Jet Flight' test pilot Tex Johnston on a roll
  Photo of the "Dash 80" with a 5th engine on the tail, as part of systems tests for the 727 program

1950s United States airliners
367-80
Quadjets
Individual aircraft in the collection of the Smithsonian Institution
Artifacts in the collection of the Smithsonian Institution
Boeing 707
Low-wing aircraft
Aircraft first flown in 1954